The 500 metres distance for men in the 2010–11 ISU Speed Skating World Cup was contested over 12 races on six occasions, out of a total of eight World Cup occasions for the season, with the first occasion taking place in Heerenveen, Netherlands, on 12–14 November 2010, and the final occasion also taking place in Heerenveen on 4–6 March 2011.

Lee Kang-seok of South Korea won the cup, while his countryman Lee Kyou-hyuk came second, and Joji Kato of Japan came third. Defending champion Tucker Fredricks of the United States finished in 4th place.

Top three

Race medallists

Standings 
Standings as of 6 March 2011 (end of the season).

References 

Men 0500